Nathaniel Lammons and Jackson Withrow defeated Jason Kubler and Luke Saville in the final, 7–6(7–5), 6–2 to win the doubles tennis title at the 2022 San Diego Open.

Joe Salisbury and Neal Skupski were the reigning champions, but chose not to defend their title.

Seeds

Draw

Draw

References

External links
Main draw

2022 ATP Tour